Moniruzzaman (known by his pen-name Hayat Mamud; born 2 July 1939) is a Bangladeshi  essayist-poet. He was awarded Ekushey Padak in 2016 by the Government of Bangladesh.

Early life and family
Mamud was born on 2 July 1939 to a Bengali Muslim family in the village of Maura in the Hooghly district of the Bengal Province. He migrated with his parents, Muhammad Shamsher Ali and Aminah Khatun, to Dacca in East Bengal as a result of the 1950 anti-Muslim riots in West Bengal.

Education
Mahmud completed his bachelor's and master's degree in Bengali Literature from University of Dhaka. He earned his Ph.D. degree on contemporary literature from Jadavpur University.

Career
Mahmud served as a faculty member of Jahangirnagar University.

Awards
 Ekushey Padak (2016)
 Bangla Academy Literary Award for children's literature

References

Living people
1939 births
University of Dhaka alumni
Jadavpur University alumni
Academic staff of Jahangirnagar University
Recipients of the Ekushey Padak
Bangladeshi male poets
People from Hooghly district
Writers from West Bengal
St. Gregory's High School and College alumni